Koro is known as a Tibeto-Burman language belonging to the Sino-Tibetan language family, even though it has resemblances to Tani farther to the east. It has been argued that Koro is actually part of the Greater Siangic family, independent from but influenced by the Sino-Tibetan family. Koro is spoken by about 1,500 people in the Koro-Aka tribe who are found in the East Kameng District of Arunachal Pradesh in northeast India. Few speakers are under 20 years old. The majority of Koro speakers live in bilingual households in which one or more members speak Ako or another indigenous language rather than Koro. The Koro-Aka tribe lives among the Aka (Hruso) tribe. However, the Koro-Aka people speak a very distantly related language from the remaining Aka tribe who speak Hruso-Aka. Researchers hypothesize Koro may have originated from a group of people enslaved and brought to the area. Since there are so few people who speak Koro, it is considered an endangered language.

Identification
Recognition in the academic literature of Koro as a distinct language goes back at least to the 2009 edition of the Ethnologue (Lewis 2009), which based its findings on a language survey conducted in 2005. It notes that Koro has only 9 percent lexical similarity with Hruso Aka, and that it is "highly dissimilar to neighboring languages".

In October 2010, the National Geographic Daily News published an article corroborating the findings of the Ethnologue based on research conducted in 2008 by a linguistic team of David Harrison, Gregory Anderson, and Ganesh Murmu while documenting two Hruso languages (Aka and Miji) as part of National Geographic's "Enduring Voices" project. It was reported to them as a dialect of Aka, but turned out to be highly divergent.

Mark Post and Roger Blench (2011) propose that Koro is related to Milang in a branch, or perhaps independent family, they call Siangic.

See also
Koro word lists (Wiktionary)

Phonology

Consonants 
Below are the consonants of Koro.

Phonemes to the left of a cell are voiceless while phonemes to the right are voiced with the exception of the glottal fricatives which are both voiceless.

The information from the chart above was collected from the most recent research done on the consonants of Koro. However, there are a few discrepancies of information between recent research and past research. 

In Geissler’s work (2013), the articulation of /ʋ/ exists and can sound similar to /v/ or /w/ depending on the speaker. There is a possibility that the articulation of /ʔ/ is not a phoneme in Koro. While a phoneme is the smallest unit of sound that can distinguish one word from another, data suggests that /ʔ/ is instead used for other unidentified roles. For example, it can be used to separate vowels, such as [ma.leʔe.tɨŋ] which means ‘fast boy.’ In other examples, /ʔ/ disappears from phrases. The word ‘that’ in Koro is [baʔ], but strangely, the glottal stop disappears in the word [ba ŋɨn] which means ‘that house’.

In Anderson’s work (2010), there exists an aspirated ph or /ɸ/. It is possible that Anderson’s data may have been influenced by the differences in speech between natives or the Hindi language used by his informants. In addition, his research does not include words that have no vowels in between consonants, but Blench argues that there are words with no vowels, resulting from the influence of the Hruso language spoken nearby. For example, the word ‘woman’ is ‘msn’ in Koro.

There is a complementary distribution between the alveolar trill /r/ and the alveolar flap /ɾ/. The trill /r/ is heard in the beginning or end of a word while the flap /ɾ/ is heard in the middle of the word.

Vowels 
Below are the vowels of Koro.

Koro has two confirmed types of vowels: oral and nasalized. There are very few diphthongs, such as -aj and -ej. The existence of long vowels is uncertain; while Blench (2018) proposes that long vowels exist, Anderson (2010) argues that only the long vowel a: might exist.

Syllables 
Koro words can have one or multiple syllables in them. The commonly seen syllable is CV, but there are plenty of other syllable structures in Koro such as CVC, CCV, and CCVC.

There are usually three parts to a syllable: the onset, the nucleus, and the coda. The nucleus is usually a vowel, and the onset and the coda are consonants that come before or after the nucleus, respectively. Onsetless syllables, which are syllables that begin with a vowel, exist in Koro, but they do not have a coda. For a coda to exist, the syllable must have an onset. The observed rule is that onsets can have a maximum of two consonants while codas can have only one. In addition, nasal vowels and codas do not occur simultaneously together.

Morphology

Nouns 
Koro nouns can be formed with suffixes. For example, there are many common animal names that have the suffix ‘-le’ in the last syllable of each word.

However, this is not always the case because in some words, the suffix ‘-le’ may not be present for an animal name or is present for another name that is not animal related.

The suffix -me is a plural marker for pronouns and, depending on the Koro speaker, for living things. 

The suffix ‘-gɨ’ is used to show possession, usually around a pronoun. This element may not be Koro’s alone but a cognate of other Tibeto-Burman languages as well. 

Pronouns in Koro have three types of persons: first, second, and third. These pronouns can either be singular or plural.

Verbs 
The suffix -ro is an imperative marker, which conveys a command or request to another person. 

The suffix -le is a negative imperative (prohibitive) marker, which conveys a command or request to not do an action to another person. 

The suffix -ŋa is a negative indicative marker, which negates a statement or question.

Syntax 
The basic word order of Koro is subject-object-verb. 

The structure of noun phrases usually follows demonstrative-noun-adjective-numerals. Demonstrative elements are determiners used to indicate a person or thing, such as the words: this, that, and those. Numerals do not need a numeral classifiers to help describe the quantity of a noun.

In ditransitive sentences in which there are two objects, the order usually follows subject-object1-object2-verb. Object 1 is the indirect object that is receiving the action while object 2 is the direct object being acted upon. 

Question words come after the subject or object.

Notes

References 

 
 
 
 
 
  (Some sound files)

Further reading

External links 

 Science Daily: New Language Identified in Remote Corner of India
 Enduring Voices Project
 Living Tongues Institute for Endangered Languages
 The New York Times: Hunting One Language, Stumbling Upon Another

Unclassified Sino-Tibetan languages
East Kameng district
Siangic languages
Endangered languages of India
Languages attested from the 2000s
Languages of Arunachal Pradesh